Yang Zhuang is a Tai language spoken in southwestern Guangxi, China, in Napo, Jingxi and Debao counties.

Li Jinfang (1999) suggests that the Yang Zhuang originally spoke the Buyang language, and later assimilated with other Tai-speaking peoples (See Buyang people#History).

Distribution
Zhuang dialects given in the county almanacs of Jingxi County, Debao County, and Napo County are listed below. This region is also known as the "Dejing" 德靖 area. All names and statistics are from the local county almanacs (县志), as quoted in Jackson et al (2012). Note that these divisions are often ethnic rather than geographic. Thus, some "Yang" peoples may actually speak non-Yang Zhuang dialects, and vice versa. Jackson (2011) shows that most Yang dialects do indeed form a distinctive subgroup against Fu (also shown to be a distinctive subgroup) and Nong.

Variants with multiple names include:
Yang 仰 in Jingxi / Nongshun 农顺 in Napo
Fu 府 in Jingxi / Lang 狼 in Debao / Nongfu 农府 in Napo
Zuozhou 佐州 in Jingxi / Zhazhou 炸州 in Napo

Jingxi County
Below are the various Zhuang dialects of Jingxi County. The townships with which the most speakers of the dialect live in are also given. Only "Yang 仰" corresponds to Yang Zhuang.
Yang 仰: 371,892 speakers; all townships
Zong 宗: 75,957 speakers; Ande 安德, Nanpo 南坡乡, Sanhe 三合, Guole 果乐乡
Long'an 隆安 (Nong'an 侬安): 26,102 speakers; Quyang 渠洋镇, Sanhe 三合, Bameng 巴蒙, Dadao 大道, Longlin 龙临镇
Zuozhou 佐州: 27,011 speakers; Xinxu 新圩, Dadao 大道, Longlin 龙临镇, Ronglao 荣劳, Ludong 禄峒
Rui/Yei 锐: 11,304 speakers; Kuixiu 魁圩乡, Bameng 巴蒙
Sheng 省: 14,718 speakers; Kuixiu 魁圩乡, Nanpo 南坡乡
Fu 府: 1,146 speakers; Bameng 巴蒙, Dadao 大道
Total: 528,130

Debao County
Zhuang dialects of Debao County are:
Lang 狼话： 255,000 speakers in all townships
Min 敏话： 17,000 speakers in Fuping township 扶平, near Napo County
Nong Zhuang 侬话
Nong Zhuang 侬话 (Southern): 17,000 speakers in Ma'ai township 马隘, Du'an township 都安, and 4 villages in Dongguan township 东关
Nong Zhuang 侬话 (Northern - Baise): 34,000 speakers in Dongling township 东凌 and Puxu township 朴圩
Nong Zhuang 侬话 (Northern - Tiandong): 17,000 speakers in Longsang township 隆桑
Total: 340,000

Napo County
Yang 央 dialects of Napo County are:
Yangzhou 央州: 41 villages
Yangdong 央垌: 100 villages
Yanggai 央改: 3 villages
Yangwu 央伍 (Yangniao 央鸟): 24 villages
Yangtai 央台: 22 villages
Yangwo 央窝
Yanglong 央龙
Yangyin 央音
Yangjie 央介
Yangnan 央南

Non-Yang dialects and their distributions in Napo County are:
Min 敏话: all townships
Dong 峒话
Nong 农话
Nongshun 农顺: Longhe township 龙合
Nongfu 农府: Chengxiang township 城厢
Bunong 布侬: Baidu township 百都, Baisheng township 百省
Rui/Yei 锐: Longhe township 龙合
Ao 嗷: Chengxiang township 城厢
Sheng 省: Pingmeng township 平孟
Jue 决: Chengxiang township 城厢
Yong 拥
Long'an 隆安: Longhe township 龙合, Baidu township 百都, Chengxiang township 城厢
Zhazhou 炸州: Longhe township 龙合

Orthography

Initials
 p/b - [p]
 ph - [pʰ]
 mb - [ˀb/ɓ]
 m/mh - [m]
 f/v - [f]
 t/d - [t]
 th - [tʰ]
 nd - [ˀd/ɗ]
 n/nh - [n]
 l/lh - [l]
 r/rh - [ɹ/ɹ̥/ð]
 sl/zl - [ɬ/θ]
 c/j - [t͡s/t͡ɕ]
 s/z - [s/ʑ]
 k/g - [k]
 kh - [kʰ]
 ng/ngh - [ŋ]
 x - [ɣ]
 w/wh - [w]
 qw - [ˀw]
 y/yh - [j]
 qy - [ˀj]
 h - [h]
 - - [ʔ]
 kw/gw - [kw]
 khw - [kʰw]
 ngw/nghw - [ŋw]
 py/by - [pj]
 phy - [pʰj]
 my/mhy - [mj]
 ky/gy - [kj]
 khy - [kʰj]
 ngy/nghy - [ŋj]

Initials for Chinese loanwords
 ch - [t͡sʰ/t͡ɕʰ/s/ɕ]
 ty - [ty]
 thy - [tʰj]
 sy - [sj/ɕj]
 cy - [t͡sj/t͡ɕj]
 chy - [t͡sʰj/t͡ɕʰj/sj/ɕj]
 sly - [θj/ɬj]
 ny - [ɲ]
 ly - [lj]
 hy - [hj]
 hw - [ʍ]

Rimes
 a - [a]
 aay - [aːj]
 aaw - [aːw]
 aam - [aːm]
 aan - [aːn]
 aang - [aːŋ]
 aap - [aːp]
 aat - [aːt]
 aak - [aːk]
 ay - [ɐj]
 aw - [ɐw]
 am - [ɐm]
 an - [ɐn]
 ang - [ɐŋ]
 ap - [ɐp]
 at - [ɐt]
 ak - [ɐk]
 ee - [eː]
 ey - [ej/əj]
 ew - [eːw]
 eem - [eːm]
 een - [eːn]
 eeng - [eːŋ]
 eep - [eːp]
 eet - [eːt]
 eek - [eːk]
 oe - [øː]
 oey - [øːj]
 oem - [øːm]
 oen - [øːn]
 oet - [øːt]
 i - [iː]
 iw - [iːw]
 im - [iːm]
 in - [iːn]
 ing - [iːŋ]
 ip - [iːp]
 it - [iːt]
 ik - [iːk]
 e - [əː]
 em - [əːm]
 en - [əːn]
 eng - [əːŋ]
 ep - [əːp]
 et - [əːt]
 ek - [əːk]
 iep - [əp]
 iet - [ət]
 iek - [ək]
 oi - [yː]
 oim - [yːm]
 oin - [yːn]
 oing - [yːŋ]
 oit - [yːt]
 oik - [yːk]
 o - [oː]
 ooy - [oːj]
 ow - [oːw]
 oom - [oːm]
 oon - [oːn]
 oong - [oːŋ]
 oop - [oːp]
 oot - [oːt]
 ook - [oːk]
 oa/oh - [ɔː]
 oy - [ɔːɥ/ɔːj]
 om - [ɔːm]
 on - [ɔːn]
 ong - [ɔːŋ]
 op - [ɔːp]
 ot - [ɔːt]
 ok - [ɔːk]
 u - [uː]
 uy - [uːj]
 uum - [uːm]
 uun - [uːn]
 uung - [uːŋ]
 uup - [uːp]
 uut - [uːt]
 uuk - [uːk]
 um - [ʊm]
 un - [ʊn]
 up - [ʊp]
 uk - [ʊk]
 oup - [ʊp]
 out - [ʊt]
 ouk - [ʊk]
 ui - [ɯː]

Notes and references

 Jackson, Eric M., Emily H.S. Jackson, and Shuh Huey Lau. 2012. "A sociolinguistic survey of the Dejing Zhuang dialect area." SIL International, Electronic Survey Reports 2012-036.
 Johnson, Eric C. 2011a. "The Southern Zhuang Languages of Yunnan Province's Wenshan Prefecture from a Sociolinguistic Perspective." [Working paper]. S.l.: s.n. 49 pages.
 Johnson, Eric C. 2011b. "A Lexical and Phonological Comparison of the Central Taic Languages of Wenshan Prefecture, China: Getting More Out of Language Survey Wordlists Than Just Lexical Similarity Percentages." SIL Electronic Working Papers 2011-005: 170.
 Li Jinfang (1999). Buyang yu yan jiu. Beijing: Central University for Nationalities Press.

External links
 Audio of Yang Zhuang

Tai languages